Sir William Ouseley HFRSE FSAScot (1767September, 1842), was a British orientalist.

Early life
Ouseley was born in Monmouthshire, the eldest son of Captain Ralph Ouseley and his wife Elizabeth (born Holland). He was tutored at home in the company of his brother, Gore and his cousin, Gideon Ouseley. All three had notable careers.

In 1787 he went to Paris to learn French, and there laid the foundation of his interest in Persian literature. In 1788 he became a cornet, a junior cavalry officer, in the 8th regiment of dragoons. At the end of 1794 he sold his commission and went to Leiden to study Persian.

Marriage and family life
In 1798 he was in Crickhowell where he eventually would publish his Travels and have them locally printed.  
He had married Julia Frances Irving in 1796 and had a large number of children. The eldest was Sir William Gore Ouseley who was a diplomat in South America and a renowned artist.

Knighted
In 1800, Charles Lord Cornwallis (1738–1805), who from 1786 to 1793 had been Governor-General of India, had him knighted in recognition of his promotion of oriental studies.

Published works
In 1795 he published Persian Miscellanies; in 1797–1799, Oriental Collections; in 1799, Epitome of the Ancient History of Persia; in 1800, The Oriental Geography of Ebn Haukal (The Oriental Geography of Ibn Hawqal);and in 1801, a translation of the Bakhtiyar-nama entitled Bakhtiyar Nama and Observations on Some Medals and Gems. He received the degree of LL.D. from the University of Dublin in 1797, and in 1800 he was knighted.

Persia
When his younger brother, Sir Gore Ouseley, was sent, in 1810, as Ambassador to what was then called Persia (Iran), Sir William accompanied him as his Secretary. In September 1812 he cadged passage on HMS Salsette, then at Smyrna, and with her returned to England in 1813. In 1819–1823 he published, in three volumes, Travels in Various Countries of Middle East, especially Persia (Iran), in 1810, 1811 and 1852. He also published editions of John Lewis Burckhardt's Travels in Arabia, Arabian Proverbs and Notes on the Bedouins and Wahbys. He contributed a number of important papers to the Transactions of the Royal Society of Literature.

He died at Boulogne-sur-Mer.

References

Attribution:

External links
 William Ouseley

1767 births
1842 deaths
People from Monmouthshire
Iranologists
19th-century Welsh historians
18th-century Welsh historians